Buglioni is a surname. Notable people with the surname include:

Benedetto Buglioni (1459/1460–1521), Italian sculptor
Frank Buglioni (born 1989), British boxer
Paolo Buglioni (born 1950), Italian actor and voice actor
Santi Buglioni (1494–1576), Italian sculptor, nephew of Benedetto